"Nyctosia" is also a misspelling of the geometer moth genus Nycterosea, presently included in Orthonama.

Nyctosia is a genus of moths in the subfamily Arctiinae. The genus was described by Schaus in 1899.

Species
 Nyctosia coccinea Schaus, 1899
 Nyctosia poicilonotus Dyar, 1912
 Nyctosia tenebrosa Walker, 1866

References

Lithosiini
Moth genera